Orchard Park High School is a secondary school in Orchard Park, New York. The school has approximately 1725 children in grades 9–12. The students are divided among three houses with a principal for each house and a principal who oversees the entire school.

History and description of campus

The main portion of the current high school building was completed in 1960 and served until 1976 as the junior high school. In 1976, a large addition and renovation process doubled the size of the building, and it became the high school. The old junior high gym became the pool and the gym was added adjacent to it. Also built was a three-story classroom addition and an auditorium adjacent to the original building. (The former high school became a middle school, which currently houses grades 6–8.) A common complaint regarding the building's design is that the narrowest staircase (capable of fitting only two people abreast) is in a central location; heavy between-period traffic often becomes congested in a bottleneck. The building had undergone only minimal refurbishment and changes since the late 1970s until the summer of 2008.

2008-2010 renovations
In 2008 renovations began in the science wing, the auditorium, the locker rooms, and turned the stage in the cafeteria into the new weight room. The old weight room is now a technology room. The Freeman entrance was also renovated, adding a larger hallway to the exit as well as a handicap ramp. All the renovations were complete by September 2010.

School District

Orchard Park High School is part of the Orchard Park Central School District, which encompasses students from towns and villages including, Orchard Park, North Boston, Colden, West Falls, and Blasdell.

The school district is broken into 4 elementary schools: Ellicott, South Davis, Eggert, and Windom.

Curriculum
Orchard Park High School offers courses in Art, Business, Math, Science, English, Social Studies, Physical Education, Foreign Language, Technology, Career and Technological Education, and Music. It offers 14 Advanced Placement courses: AP World History, AP European History, AP US History, AP US Government and Politics, AP Macroeconomics, AP Calculus, (AB and BC) AP Latin, AP Spanish, AP French Language, AP Physics, AP Chemistry, AP Computer Science, AP Music Theory, AP English Language and Composition, and AP English Literature and Composition.

Extracurricular activities
Student groups and activities include Drama Club, Cancer Awareness Club, History Club, Math Club, Masterminds, Media Productions Club, Medical Career Interest Group, Mock Trial, Book Club, Student-Run Literary Magazine (Pulse),Student Newspaper (The Voice), Mock Trial Club, Ecology Club, Model UN, Destination Imagination, Rugby, DECA, Color Guard, Pep Club, and Winter Guard. The school also has an interactive student, teacher, parent, and administrator government program known as STAP-Comm.

Athletics
Athletic opportunities include Cross-country, indoor track and field, outdoor track and field, softball (2015 Class AA State Champions and 2016 Class AA State Finalists), football (2008 and 2011 Class AA State Champions), wrestling, baseball (1988 New York State Class A Champions) basketball (2010 ECIC Division I Regular Season Champions), archery, swimming and diving (1999-2000 New York State Champions), rifle, bowling, tennis, lacrosse, field hockey, cheerleading, gymnastics, golf (2013-2017 ECIC Team Champions),varsity hockey (2019 Section VI, Far west Regional Champions), club hockey (winner of the last eight "Super Thursdays" for the Southtowns Club Hockey League), and volleyball.

Performing arts
Orchard Park is home to the Quaker Marching Band (2007 New York State Field Band Conference Champions), and several additional ensembles including Wind Ensemble, Symphonic Band, Checkmates, Jazz Ensemble, String Orchestra, Full Orchestra, Swing Chorus, Choraliers, Mixed Chorus and Girls' Chorus. Students at Orchard Park High School can also participate in a strong theatrical program well known for their musicals and dramas. In spring of 2014, the Drama Club presented Les Misérables (musical) and received Kenny Awards for Outstanding Production, Rising Star, Best Actor in a Supporting Role, Best Actress in a Supporting Role, and Best Orchestral Performance. The Drama Department also was nominated again in 2017 for their production of Stephen Sondheim's Into the Woods winning for Best Orchestral Performance and Best Scenic Design, whilst still being nominated for Best Costume Design, Best Technical Design and Best Actor in a Supporting Role.

School spirit and traditions
The school mascot is Opie the Quaker. The school colors are Maroon and White.

Homecoming Week
Like most schools, O.P.H.S. has a school spirit week on the week before homecoming, with themes such as neon day and school color day. On Friday of spirit week the school has a pep rally and a Powder Puff game which features the junior girls versus the senior girls. On Saturday of that week there is a parade in the morning, the varsity football game in the afternoon, and the dance later that night.

Faculty Basketball Game
O.P.H.S. also holds an annual Faculty Basketball Game to boost school spirit and to fund raise for charity. Faculty members are drafted to play for one of four teams that correspond with grades 9–12, with the first selection given to the class that raised the most money that year. The event is best known for its electric atmosphere with participating teachers and staff taking on nicknames like "Crusher" to pump up the crowd. In 2008, legendary football coach Gene Tundo made a dramatic 10 point half-court shot in the waning moments to propel the underdog Freshmen over the Seniors.

Notable alumni
Chuck Bullough, former NFL player, Syracuse Defensive Coordinator 
Jim Burt, NFL player
Jon Corto, Former NFL special teams player, Buffalo Bills
Brian Dux, BBL MVP
Dave Hollins, Former MLB third baseman, now Baltimore Orioles scout
Rick James, American singer-songwriter, multi-instrumentalist and producer.
John Koelmel, Former CEO of First Niagara Bank
Larry Pfohl (Lex Luger), professional wrestler
Ron Pitts, former NFL player, now NFL on FOX Sports broadcaster
William Sadler, Saturn Award-winning actor
Todd Schlopy, former NFL player, Buffalo Bills
Josh Thomas, Indianapolis Colts defensive end
Craig Wolfley, former NFL player, brother of Ron Wolfley.
Ron Wolfley, former NFL player, brother of Craig Wolfley.
Tim Bender, Snowmobile Hall of Fame member.

References

Public high schools in New York (state)
Schools in Erie County, New York
1976 establishments in New York (state)